The Kamchatka Peninsula is a peninsula in northeast Russia. 

Kamchatka may also refer to:

Places
Kamchatka Krai, federal administrative division of Russia covering the Kamchatka Peninsula established in 2007
Kamchatka Oblast, former administrative division of Russia
Kamchatka (river), river in the Kamchatka Peninsula, Russia
Kamchatka Strait, strait in the Bering Sea

Ships
Kamchatka (1817), Russian frigate that circumnavigated the globe between 1817 and 1819 under Vasily Golovnin
Russian frigate Kamchatka (1841), Russian steam frigate
Kamchatka (ship), Russian steamship launched 1903

Music
 Kamchatka (band), Swedish rock band
Kamchatka (album), 2005 album by Kamchatka
 "Kamchatka" (song), song by Soviet rock band Kino

Other uses
 Kamchatka (film), 2002 Argentine film
Kamchatka Vodka, brand of vodka made in Kentucky by Beam Inc.